This article lists the squads for the 2022 Pinatar Cup, the second edition of the Pinatar Cup. The cup consisted of a series of friendly games, and will be held in Spain from 16 to 22 February 2022. The eight national teams involved in the tournament registered a squad of 23 players.

The age listed for each player is on 16 February 2022, the first day of the tournament. The numbers of caps and goals listed for each player do not include any matches played after the start of tournament. The club listed is the club for which the player last played a competitive match prior to the tournament. The nationality for each club reflects the national association (not the league) to which the club is affiliated. A flag is included for coaches that are of a different nationality than their own national team.

Squads

Belgium
Coach: Ives Serneels

The 28-player squad was announced on 8 February 2022.

Hungary
Coach: Margrét Kratz

The 23-player squad was announced on 2 February 2022. On 14 February 2022, Luca Papp and Sára Pusztai withdrew from the squad and were replaced by Beatrix Fördős and Adrienn Oláh.

Ireland
Coach:  Vera Pauw

The 27-player squad was announced on 11 February 2022. A few days later, Niamh Farrelly withdrew from the squad due to injury and was replaced by Chloe Mustaki.

Poland
Coach: Nina Patalon

The 26-player squad was announced on 11 February 2022. Following the announcement, Sylwia Matysik and Paulina Filipczak withdrew due to knee injuries and were replaced by Wiktorię Zieniewicz and Weronikę Wójcik.

Russia
Coach: Yuri Krasnozhan

The 23-player squad was announced on 14 February 2022.

Scotland
Coach:  Pedro Martínez Losa

The 26-player squad was announced on 8 February 2022. The following week, Erin Cuthbert and Chloe Logan withdrew due to injury and were replaced by Leah Eddie and Rachael Johnstone.

Slovakia
Coach: Peter Kopún

The 24-player squad was announced on 8 February 2022. The following week Klaudia Fabová and Tereza Mrocková withdrew from the squad and were replaced by Stela Semanová and Laura Bieliková.

Wales
Coach:  Gemma Grainger

The 26-player squad was announced on 9 February 2022.

Player representation

By club
Clubs with four or more players represented are listed.

By club nationality

By club federation

By representatives of domestic league

References

Pinatar Cup